Sugar Bush Township is the name of some places in the U.S. state of Minnesota:
Sugar Bush Township, Becker County, Minnesota
Sugar Bush Township, Beltrami County, Minnesota

Minnesota township disambiguation pages